Andrew Peck (born 3 July 1973, in New Zealand) is a New Zealand kickboxer. He is the 2010 WMC Super Heavyweight Intercontinental Champion.

Biography

Originally from Auckland, New Zealand Andrew Peck began training Muaythai at the age of 18. One year later, he added karate to his strengths. Peck moved to Japan to live and train. He worked his way through the amateur ranks of kickboxing and karate until his impressive professional debut in 2000 when he won the K-1 New Zealand Grand Prix by three first-round knockouts.

In his next tournament, the K-1 World Grand Prix 2002 Preliminary Melbourne, Peck made it to the semi-finals only to be beaten by Mark Hunt. He bounced back by winning the WKBF South Pacific Super Heavyweight Kickboxing Championship in 2001. In 2002, he made his K-1 Japan debut. By 2004 he was the WMC New Zealand Super Heavyweight title holder and decided to retire only to return to the K-1 circuit in 2006. Still living up to his nickname he won the K-1 Kings of Oceania title in 2007.

He is married and has two children.

Championships and Accomplishments
 2010 WMC Intercontinental Super Heavyweight Champion
 2009 WPMF New Zealand Super Heavyweight Champion
 2007 K-1 Kings of Oceania Round 1 Champion
 2004 WMC New Zealand Super Heavyweight Champion
 2002 K-1 World Grand Prix Preliminary Melbourne Finalist
 2001 WKBF South Pacific Super Heavyweight Kickboxing Champion
 2000 K-1 New Zealand Grand Prix Champion

Kickboxing record 

|-  style="background:#fbb;"
|-
|-  bgcolor="#CCFFCC"
| 2014-09-07 || Win ||align=left| Ryo Aitaka || HEAT 33 || Nagoya, Japan || TKO || 1 || 2:06
|-  bgcolor="#CCFFCC"
| 2013-10-18 || Win ||align=left| Mika Maliefulu || Heavyweight War || Auckland, New Zealand ||  ||  || 
|-  bgcolor="#CCFFCC"
| 2013-04-13 || Win ||align=left| Tafa Misipati || King of the Ring || Auckland, New Zealand || Decision (3-0)  || 3 || 3:00 
|-  bgcolor="#FFBBBB"
| 2011-06-23 || Loss ||align=left| Koichi Watanabe || M-1 Fairtex Challenge || Tokyo, Japan || KO || 3 || 
|-  bgcolor="#FFBBBB"
| 2010-12-30 || Loss ||align=left| Fabiano Aoki || SRC - Soul of Fight || Tokyo, Japan || TKO (Cut) || 2 ||  
|-  bgcolor="#CCFFCC"
| 2010-09-03 || Win ||align=left| Faisal Zakaria || Universal Soldier|| Auckland, New Zealand || KO || 4 || 0:45
|-
! style=background:white colspan=9 |
|-
|-  bgcolor="#CCFFCC"
| 2009-11-07 || Win ||align=left| Vini Mahoni || Pathai Promotion || Auckland, New Zealand || TKO (Corner stoppage) || 3 || 
|-
! style=background:white colspan=9 |
|-
|-  bgcolor="#FFBBBB"
| 2009-08-29 || Loss ||align=left| Ben Edwards || World Domination II || Canberra, Australia || TKO (Referee stoppage) || 1 || 2:24
|-
! style=background:white colspan=9 |
|-
|-  bgcolor="#CCFFCC"
| 2009-06-20 || Win ||align=left| Eduardo Maiorino || New Zealand vs. Brazil || Auckland, New Zealand ||  ||  || 
|-  bgcolor="#FFBBBB"
| 2008-11-25 || Loss||align=left| Thor Hoopman || Planet Battle GP 2008, Semi Finals || Hong Kong || KO || 2 || 
|-  bgcolor="#CCFFCC"
| 2008-11-25 || Win ||align=left| Chris Knowles || Planet Battle GP 2008, Quarter Finals || Hong Kong || Decision || 3 || 3:00
|-  bgcolor="#FFBBBB"
| 2008-07-13 || Loss ||align=left| Prince Ali || HEAT 7 || Nagoya, Japan || KO || 2 || 2:03 
|-  bgcolor="#CCFFCC"
| 2008-06-25 || Win ||align=left| Bruno Schwartz || Planet Battle I || Wan Chai, Hong Kong || KO (Left highkick) || 2 || 
|-  bgcolor="#FFBBBB"
| 2008-02-08 || Loss ||align=left| Stipan Radić || KO World Series 2008 in Oceania, Semi Finals || Auckland, New Zealand || KO || 2 || 
|-  bgcolor="#CCFFCC"
| 2007-11-25 || Win ||align=left| Ryuta Noji || HEAT 5|| Nagoya, Japan || Decision (3-0) || 3 || 3:00
|-  bgcolor="#CCFFCC"
| 2007-04-14 || Win ||align=left| Felise Leniu || K-1 Kings of Oceania 2007 Round 1 || Auckland, New Zealand || TKO || 2 || 
|-
! style=background:white colspan=9 |
|-
|-  bgcolor="#CCFFCC"
| 2007-04-14 || Win ||align=left| Leamy Tato || K-1 Kings of Oceania 2007 Round 1 || Auckland, New Zealand || TKO || 2 || 
|-  bgcolor="#CCFFCC"
| 2007-04-14 || Win ||align=left| Charlie Smiler || K-1 Kings of Oceania 2007 Round 1 || Auckland, New Zealand || TKO || 2 || 
|-  bgcolor="#CCFFCC"
| 2007-03-24 || Win ||align=left| Koichi Watanabe || HEAT 3 || Nagoya, Japan || Decision (3-0) || 3 || 3:00 
|-  bgcolor="#CCFFCC"
| 2006-11-18 || Win ||align=left| Matt Samoa || K-1 Kings of Oceania 2006 Round 3 || Auckland, New Zealand || TKO (3 knockdowns) || 2 || 2:50
|-  bgcolor="#FFBBBB"
| 2006-09-16 || Loss ||align=left| Peter Graham || K-1 Kings of Oceania 2006 Round 2 || Auckland, New Zealand || TKO (Low Kicks) || 2 || 
|-  bgcolor="#FFBBBB"
| 2006-06-24 || Loss ||align=left| Doug Viney || K-1 Kings of Oceania 2006 Round 1 || Auckland, New Zealand || Decision || 3 || 3:00
|-  bgcolor="#FFBBBB"
| 2005-08-18 || Loss ||align=left| Paul Slowinski || Knees of Fury 10 WMC World Heavyweight GP, Quarter Final || Australia || KO (Right hook) || 1 || 2:00
|-  bgcolor="#FFBBBB"
| 2005-06-24 || Loss ||align=left| Daniel Tai || New Zealand vs. Russia || Auckland, New Zealand || Decision (0-3) || 3 || 3:00
|-  bgcolor="#FFBBBB"
| 2004-04-23 || Loss ||align=left| Paul Slowinski || K-1 Battle of Anzacs 2004 || Auckland, New Zealand || KO (Right hook) || 1 || 
|-  bgcolor="#FFBBBB"
| 2003-11-07 || Loss ||align=left| Hiriwa Te Rangi || K-1 World GP 2004 Preliminary: New Zealand, Semi Finals || Auckland, New Zealand || KO || 3 || 
|-  bgcolor="#CCFFCC"
| 2003-11-07 || Win ||align=left| Clay Auimatagi || K-1 World GP 2004 Preliminary: New Zealand, Quarter Finals || Auckland, New Zealand || Decision (3-0) || 3 || 3:00
|-  bgcolor="#FFBBBB"
| 2003-09-12 || Loss ||align=left| Danijel Marhold || K-1 Final Fight || Split, Croatia || KO || 2|| 0:30
|-
|-  bgcolor="#FFBBBB"
| 2003-07-27 || Loss ||align=left| Jason Suttie || K-1 World Grand Prix 2003 in Melbourne, Semi Finals || Melbourne, Australia || KO (Left Hook) || 1 || 1:02
|-  bgcolor="#CCFFCC"
| 2003-07-27 || Win ||align=left| Auckland Aumitagi || K-1 World Grand Prix 2003 in Melbourne, Quarter Finals || Melbourne, Australia || TKO (Right Knee, 2 Knockdowns) || 2 || 1:09
|-  bgcolor="#CCFFCC"
| 2003-05-29 || Win ||align=left| Terry Tuteru || Kio at the Ocean City || Melbourne, Australia || KO || 4 || 
|-  bgcolor="#FFBBBB"
| 2003-04-11 || Loss ||align=left| Josip Bodrožić || K-1 Lord of the Rings || Auckland, New Zealand || KO (Punch) || 1 ||
|-  bgcolor="#FFBBBB"
| 2002-11-08 || Loss ||align=left| Doug Viney || K-1 New Zealand Grand Prix 2003 in Auckland, Semi Finals || Auckland, New Zealand || Decision || 3 || 3:00
|-  bgcolor="#CCFFCC"
| 2002-11-08 || Win ||align=left| Hiriwa Te Rangi || K-1 New Zealand Grand Prix 2003 in Auckland, Quarter Finals || Auckland, New Zealand || KO || 3 || 2:50
|-  bgcolor="#c5d2ea"
| 2002-04-21 || Draw ||align=left| Ryuta Noji || K-1 Burning 2002 || Hiroshima, Japan || Decision Draw || 5 || 3:00 
|-  bgcolor="#FFBBBB"
| 2002-02-18 || Loss ||align=left| Adam Watt || K-1 World Grand Prix 2002 Preliminary Melbourne, Finals || Melbourne, Australia || KO || 1 || 1:50 
|-
! style=background:white colspan=9 |
|-
|-  bgcolor="#CCFFCC"
| 2002-02-18 || Win ||align=left| Doug Viney || K-1 World Grand Prix 2002 Preliminary Melbourne, Semi Finals || Melbourne, Australia || KO || 1 || 1:38
|-  bgcolor="#CCFFCC"
| 2002-02-18 || Win ||align=left| Rony Sefo || K-1 World Grand Prix 2002 Preliminary Melbourne, Quarter Finals || Melbourne, Australia || Decision (3-0) || 3 || 3:00
|-  bgcolor="#CCFFCC"
| 2001-12-13 || Win ||align=left| Auckland Aumitagi || Payback || Auckland, New Zealand ||  ||  || 
|-  bgcolor="#FFBBBB"
| 2001-02-24 || Loss ||align=left| Mark Hunt || K-1 Oceania Grand Prix 2001 in Melbourne, Semi Finals || Melbourne, Australia || KO (Right Punch) || 1 || 0:48 
|-  bgcolor="#CCFFCC"
| 2001-02-24 || Win ||align=left| Paul Robinson || K-1 Oceania Grand Prix 2001 in Melbourne, Quarter Finals || Melbourne, Australia || Decision (Unanimous) || 3 || 3:00
|-  bgcolor="#CCFFCC"
| 2000-11-10 || Win ||align=left| Rony Sefo || K-1 New Zealand Grand Prix 2000, Finals || Auckland, New Zealand || KO (Right high kick) || 1 || 0:54
|-
! style=background:white colspan=9 |
|-
|-  bgcolor="#CCFFCC"
| 2000-11-10 || Win ||align=left| Auckland Aumitagi || K-1 New Zealand Grand Prix 2000, Semi Finals || Auckland, New Zealand || KO || 2 || 
|-  bgcolor="#CCFFCC"
| 2000-11-10 || Win ||align=left| Foma'I Taho-Tusa || K-1 New Zealand Grand Prix 2000, Quarter Finals || Auckland, New Zealand || KO ||  || 
|-  bgcolor="#CCFFCC"
| 2000-08-16 || Win ||align=left| Josh Khan || Power Station || Auckland, New Zealand ||  ||  ||
|-
| colspan=9 | Legend:

References

Notes
 

New Zealand male kickboxers
Living people
1973 births